María Consuelo Holzapfel Ossa (Valdivia, March 27, 1956) is a Chilean actress and theater director, known for her collaborations with the director Vicente Sabatini, and one of the most prominent actresses of the currently known as the golden age of telenovelas of Chilean television in the 1990s.

Filmography

Films

Telenovelas

TV Series

References

1956 births
Living people
Chilean film actresses
Chilean television actresses
20th-century Chilean actresses
21st-century Chilean actresses
Austral University of Chile alumni